Andrew S. Knewstubb (born 14 September 1995) is a New Zealand rugby sevens and rugby union player. His position is fullback. He represented New Zealand at the 2020 Summer Olympics.

Career 
He won gold medal with the New Zealand team in the men's rugby sevens tournament during the 2018 Commonwealth Games. He was also a key member of the New Zealand side which won the 2018 Rugby World Cup Sevens tournament by defeating England 33-12 in the final. He was named in the New Zealand squad to compete at the 2020 Summer Olympics in the men's rugby sevens tournament. He was also part of the New Zealand side which claimed silver medal after losing to Fiji 24-12 at the 2020 Summer Olympics. It was also New Zealand's first ever Olympic medal in the men's rugby sevens.

Knewstubb was named as a late signing for  during the 2021 Bunnings NPC after a season ending injury to Mark Telea. He made his debut for Tasman against  at Trafalgar Park in a non competition match, starting in the number 15 jersey and scoring a try in a 26–9 win for the Mako.

References

External links
 
 
 
 

Rugby union fullbacks
New Zealand rugby union players
1995 births
Living people
Rugby sevens players at the 2018 Commonwealth Games
Rugby sevens players at the 2020 Summer Olympics
Olympic rugby sevens players of New Zealand
Sportspeople from Wellington City
Commonwealth Games gold medallists for New Zealand
Commonwealth Games medallists in rugby sevens
Olympic silver medalists for New Zealand
Olympic medalists in rugby sevens
Medalists at the 2020 Summer Olympics
Canterbury rugby union players
Tasman rugby union players
Medallists at the 2018 Commonwealth Games